Everybody's Angel is the third studio album by Tanita Tikaram, released in 1991.

Background

Tikaram wrote the majority of the songs that form the album between December 1989-January 1990, just before the release of her second album The Sweet Keeper, with "Hot Pork Sandwiches" dating far back to 1988.

The basic recording of the album took place in June 1990 at Bearsville Studios in Woodstock, New York. The same team of musicians that had worked on her previous two albums were brought to play for this one, including Mark Isham, Helen O'Hara and Mark Creswell. Further recordings took place at Abbey Road Studios back in England. As with her previous two albums, Rod Argent and Peter van Hooke produced the record, but for the first time Tikaram co-produced the songs as well, a move she said she had not felt confident enough to do on the previous two records. This would be the last time Tikaram collaborated with Argent and van Hooke on production.

Jennifer Warnes, of whom Tikaram had always declared being a fan, and whom Tikaram had met when Warnes attended one of her concerts at The Roxy in 1989, added harmony vocals on two songs on the album, the single "Only the Ones We Love" and "Mud in Any Water".

Two songs on the album, "Hot Pork Sandwiches" and "I Love the Heaven's Solo" had previously been released in 1990 in acoustic versions as b-sides to the single "Little Sister Leaving Town".

Release and reception

The album sold moderately well in Europe, but there was an evident decline in sales in comparison with Tikaram's previous albums, and in most territories this was the singer's last album to achieve a chart placing, including the USA. Everybody's Angel debuted and peaked at #19 in the UK, and achieved similar top 20 placings around Europe, but fell off the charts pretty quickly. In the USA, it peaked at a low #142.

Reviews were mixed, but generally found the record more inspired than her second album The Sweet Keeper. Most of the reviews also noted a strong Van Morrison influence on the sound of the album.

Two singles were released off the album. The lead single "Only the Ones We Love", with backup vocals by Jennifer Warnes, did not become a substantial hit and only peaked at #69 in the UK. The second single, a re-recorded "I Love the Heaven's Solo" with a gospel choir, did not chart at all. The album track "Deliver Me" was touted as a possible third single (or US-only single) as it was getting a good response, but no release ever came to be.

Track listing 
All tracks composed by Tanita Tikaram
"Only the Ones We Love"
"Deliver Me"
"This Story in Me"
"To Wish This"
"Mud in Any Water"
"Sunface"
"Never Known"
"This Stranger"
"Swear By Me"
"Hot Pork Sandwiches"
"Me in Mind"
"Sometime with Me"
"I Love the Heaven's Solo"
"I'm Going Home"

Charts

Personnel
Tanita Tikaram – guitar, vocals
David Hayes – bass
Mark Isham – trumpet, flugelhorn
Jennifer Warnes – harmony vocals
Rod Argent – piano, Hammond organ, harmony vocals, string arrangements & conductor
James Archer – violin
Mark Berrow – violin
Mike Brittain – double bass
Richie Buckley – alto & tenor saxophone
David Emanuel – viola
Lyn Fletcher – violin
Wilfred Gibson – violin
Roy Gillard – violin
Jack Glickman – viola
Paul Kegg – cello
Ben Kennard – cello
Carol Kenyon – harmony vocals
Katie Kissoon – harmony vocals
Andrew McGee – viola
Jim McLeod – violin
Helen O'Hara – violin
Peter Oxer – violin
Anthony Pleeth – cello
Paul Silverthorne – viola
Barry Wilde – violin
Mark Creswell – guitar
Martin Robinson – cello

Notes 

1991 albums
Tanita Tikaram albums
Albums produced by Rod Argent
Albums produced by Peter Van Hooke
East West Records albums